Skardtind  is a mountain in Innlandet county, Norway. The mountain is a tripoint border point which lies along the border between the municipalities of Skjåk, Lom, and Lesja.

See also
List of mountains of Norway

References

Mountains of Innlandet
Lesja
Skjåk
Lom, Norway